Hansanagari also known as Hansot, is a village in Bharuch district, Southern Gujarat, India. The village and its surrounding taluka were acquired by the British in 1775, and subsequently returned to the local princely rulers in 1783, being finally incorporated into the Broach district of the Bombay Presidency in 1803.

History
Hansot was once a small village known as 'Hansnagari' during the British colonial era. Soon, it grew into a town, and now, it stands as a Taluka with a population of about 15,000. For the period, Gregorian centuries 16, 17 and 18. In Ain-i-Akbari, it is mentioned as a mahal headquarters, and a port of sarkar Broach. In Mirat-i-Ahmadi, it is mentioned as a mahal headquarters.

History of Hansot

In medieval times Hansot was an important port. During Mughal era they used to travel to Egypt, Africa and several Arab countries from here for trade. During this period landlords and rich people owned huge mansions due to which Hansot was known as a very prosperous town. Because of its prosperity many traders were robbed by pagan pirates at sea as well as in the town. Around 1600 C.E. Mughal emperor Jahangir, in leadership of Chauhans from Aamer (Rajasthan) sent an army with back up from Sindhis of Karachi on the naval front.

Geography
It is the largest village between Surat and Ankleshwar.

Economy and infrastructure
It has modern amenities, including electricity, telephone, bus station, primary and higher secondary schools, hospitals and libraries. An attraction in Hansot is the Dargah (Tomb) of a Muslim Sufi Sheikh known as "Hazrat Mansur Shah Urf Chotumiyan." An annual Urs (Death Anniversary) attracts up to 350,000 people of all faiths. The people seek shelter in the complex of the dargah and are fed throughout the course of three days. Farming is the main occupation and many people migrate to find jobs. Since the Narmada river is nearby, Hansot is also famous for its fish.

Taluka

Hansot's Taluka consists of 52 villages. The word 'Taluka' means 'jurisdiction'. Several areas come under Hansot Taluka:
 Alva or Ilvaa
 Ambheta
 Aniyandra
 Asarma
 Balota 
 Chhilodara
 Dantrai 
 Digas
 Ilav (also 'Ilaaw', 'Elav' and 'Elaw').
 Katpor 
 Kantiajal 
 Mangrol
 Sahol 
 Shera
 Sunevkhurd (nani Sunev)
 Sunevkalla (moti Sunev)
 Rayma 
 Ankalva
 Utraj
 Vaghwan or Waagwan
 Valner or Waalner
 Vansnali or Waansnoli 
 Wamleshwar
Digas
Mothiya

Culture
After a hard day's work, the men traditionally retired to rest, often signified by adoption of the sarong-like Lungi. This indicates southern Arabian (Hadhramawti) or Malay influences. A romantic passion for racing horses on the days of Eid, from the ancient historic Eid Gah and across the beaches washed by the Arabian Sea. This indicates Arabian and Mughal influences.

Language
The language is an archaic proto-Urdu one, being neither completely in the camp of standard northern Delhi Urdu, nor southern Dakhni Urdu. It is said by some to belong to the middle zone i.e. "Bombay Urdu", as with related cognates. The language has defiantly retained Arabic and Turkic words, neither of which exist in many later Urdu standardisations. It has also picked up words from regional Indic languages, from northern to southern regions. As Hansotis are often seen as a rather independent and clannish community, with words being altered, the services of the professional academic would not go amiss. Notable words are Sabāh (Subah, morning) , Kāti, Kāikélyèh (Kis liye, what  reason), Baydāh (egg) , Māndāh (Bimar, sick), Lawar (food), Choolāh (Stove), Gokhlay, cho (Chai, tea), Ko Jatay (kaha chala, where are you going).

Demographics
Hansotis are a cosmopolitan array of ethnicities divided into two main groups: Muslims and Hindus. Their surnames are multi-layered reflecting their complex histories, and include amongst others, Shaikh (Sheikh), Pathan, Malek (Malik), Khwaja, Patel, Munshi, Mujad, Chauhan and Kanuga. These people, who number 6,000, are thus Gujarati Muslims, by heritage and geographical origin.

Notable people
 Farooq Shaikh, Indian actor for Bollywood and theatre, philanthropist and popular Television presenter.
 Abdul-Ahad Malik, cricketer for Rajasthan Royals.
 Sharif Kanuga, Politician Indian National CongressCurrently Working As A President Ankleshwar-Hansot Assembly Youth Congress.Won Election with Highest Margin in Bharuch District.Ex Deputy Leader of Opposition Ankleshwar Municipality, State Secretary Gujarat Pradesh Congress Committee I.T Cell
  Indravadan Ambalal Modi, he was founder member of Cadila labs, now Cadila pharmacy. Currently Cadila pharmacy is an Indian multi-national, pharmaceutical company, having a presence in the niche therapy areas of Gastro, Cardio, Pain management, nutraceutical and now biological products.
 Zainul Abedin Munshi, (1920-1975) Hansot born Deputy Secretary (Agriculture), Government of Sind, Pakistan. He was a Professor of Botany, who worked alongside colleagues at CIMMYT Mexico with the "Father of the Green Revolution," the Nobel Prize winner Norman Borlaug. The wheat cultivars H68, TJ 558, Mexipak-65 & Pak 70 are an important contribution.

See also
 Gujarat
 Gulf of Cambay
 Kim Creek
 Panoli

References

External links 
 Hansot taluka panchayat webpage (Gujarati language)
 Hansot Plates

Villages in Bharuch district